Allan Schwartzberg (born December 28, 1942) is an American musician and record producer. He has been a member of the rock band Mountain, Peter Gabriel's first solo band, toured with Brecker Brothers' Dreams, B.J. Thomas, Linda Rondstadt, Stan Getz band, and the Pat Travers band. He has experienced success as a prolific session musician, through recordings made from the 1970s through today. He has also played on multi genre hits such as Gloria Gaynor "Never Can Say Goodbye", considered the first disco record, James Brown's "Funky President" (his beat has been sampled on 808 different records), Harry Chapin's "Cat's in the Cradle", Tony Orlando & Dawn's Tie A Yellow Ribbon, Peter Gabriel's "Solsbury Hill", the Spinners' "Workin' My Way Back to You", the Star Wars theme, and Rod Stewart's Great American Songbook series including the hit "What A Wonderful World". He has played with musicians and singers including John Lennon, Diana Ross, James Brown, Jimi Hendrix, Alice Cooper, Kiss, Frank Sinatra, Roxy Music, Rod Stewart, Robert Palmer, Grace Slick, Roberta Flack, Barry Manilow, Harry Chapin, Barbra Streisand, Deodato, Frankie Valli, Tony Orlando, and Roger Daltrey. He was also a frequent musician guest with Paul Shaffer's David Letterman Show band.

Early life and education
Allan Schwartzberg was born on December 28, 1942, in New York City, New York. He is Jewish and attended yeshiva as a child. He began playing the drums at the age of ten and attended the Manhattan School of Music for three years, studying classical percussion. He claims that his real education was listening to and memorizing the work of musicians like Max Roach, Elvin Jones and Philly Joe Jones.

At the age of 20. he was the house drummer at the famed Half Note Club in downtown New York, performing with a variety of jazz musicians, including Stan Getz, Al Cohn, Zoot Sims, Roy Eldridge, Bob Brookmeyer, Richie Kamuca, Jim Hall, Ron Carter, Anita O'Day, Chris Conner, and Jimmy Rushing.

He was also the leader of the band on the nationally syndicated Geraldo Rivera Show, Goodnight America, which was considered the first rock / R&B "hip" band for a talk show.

Personal life
On November 12, 1972, Schwartzberg married Susan Schlossberg. They have two daughters, Samona and Nicole; and three grandchildren, Deven, Talia, and Quinton Cole.

Equipment
Schwartzberg endorses Yamaha drums, Zildjian cymbals, Remo drumheads, and Vic Firth drumsticks.

Discography

1970s

1980s

1990s

2000s

See also
 List of drummers

References

Sources
Jim Payne, Harry Weinger – The Great Drummers of R&B Funk & Soul

External links

Living people
American rock drummers
American session musicians
Mountain (band) members
Alice Cooper (band) members
1942 births
American jazz drummers
Record producers from New York (state)
Musicians from New York City
Manhattan School of Music alumni
20th-century American drummers
American male drummers
Jazz musicians from New York (state)
20th-century American male musicians
American male jazz musicians
The Group with No Name members
Jewish heavy metal musicians
Jewish jazz musicians